Charles Eisenstein (born 1967) is an American public speaker and author. His work covers a wide range of topics, including the history of human civilization, economics, spirituality, and the ecology movement. Key themes explored include anti-consumerism, interdependence, and how myth and narrative influence culture. According to Eisenstein, global culture is immersed in a destructive "story of separation", and one of the main goals of his work is to present an alternative "story of interbeing". Much of his work draws on ideas from Eastern philosophy and the spiritual teachings of various indigenous peoples. Eisenstein has been involved in the Occupy, New Economy, and permaculture movements.

Life 

Born in 1967, Eisenstein graduated from Yale University in 1989 with a degree in Mathematics and Philosophy. He lived in Taiwan for nine years, where he became fluent in Mandarin Chinese and worked as a translator. He married there, had children, and later returned to the United States. He describes his late 20s through his mid 30s as "a long period of intensifying crisis". During this time, he held short term positions as a construction worker, college instructor, and yoga teacher, but spent most of his time as a stay-at-home dad. He then spent four years writing The Ascent of Humanity, which was published in 2007 and became his first commercially successful book, launching his writing career. Eisenstein has four sons; one with his current wife, Stella, and three with his previous wife, Patsy. He currently lives in Asheville, North Carolina.

Writings

The Ascent of Humanity
The Ascent of Humanity, published in 2007, draws together Eisenstein's thoughts about the history of human civilization. It explores the development of what he calls the "separate human realm", drawing distinctions between hunter-gatherer and agricultural societies. In Eisenstein's view, a greater sense of separation from nature began with the emergence of agriculture and has been accelerating to the present day.

Other themes include the role of various languages, mathematics, art, religions and other symbolic systems to structure subjective reality at the levels of the individual and of culture. He argues that these have a strong, largely unconscious effect on attitudes toward time and the natural world.

It was read on the Unwelcome Guests radio show and the reading was later released as an audiobook.

Sacred Economics
Eisenstein wrote his 2011 book Sacred Economics as part of the New Economy movement. The book revolves around the theme of how the current monetary system based on interest and usury, along with the abandonment of the gift economy, led to social alienation, competition and need for an economic system predicated on continuous growth. It has been either fully or partially translated into at least nine languages. Accordingly, his primary goal is the reestablishment of some form of gift economy as a means of strengthening relationships in contrast to money economies which commodify our relationships and render people interchangeable.  He asserts that money is created by the conversion of free human interactions into paid services. Eisenstein himself attempts to practice the gift economy in his own life.

The book explores additional economic proposals including a negative-interest currency following Silvio Gesell, social dividends, economic degrowth, and a personal emphasis on right livelihood over financial motivation. In other writings, he has also advocated for universal basic income. He describes and rejects what he describes as the myth of scarcity which he claims fosters greed and anxiety.

The More Beautiful World Our Hearts Know Is Possible
The More Beautiful World Our Hearts Know Is Possible was published in November 2013. It argues that many of the social, economic, political, and environmental problems covered in his earlier works can be traced to an underlying worldview that he calls the "Story of Separation"—that humans are separate from each other and from the rest of the natural world. A new story that is emerging, the "Story of Interbeing", is a "story of the world that we really care about". The book describes this as a time of transition between these stories: "Internally, it [the transition] is ... a transformation in the experience of being alive. Externally is it ... a transformation of humanity's role on planet Earth". He deconstructs the old story while describing the new. For example, the best way to interrupt the story of separation is to give someone an experience of non-separation. Publishers' Weekly described it as "a revolutionary and interactive book—in the sense that it inspires the reader to think out of the ordinary", adding that Eisenstein "will be noted in antiquity as one of the seminal and pioneering storytellers of this new world".

Climate—A New Story
Climate—A New Story was published in 2018. It is described as 'flipping the script on climate change', and addresses the framing, tactics and goals of our approach to environmental issues. Eisenstein proposes that if we were to feel that the rivers, forests, and creatures of the natural and material world were sacred or at least valuable in their own right, then our response might be more wholesome and ultimately effective. He decries valuing the living world simply for its carbon credits or for preventing the extinction of one species or another.

Other work

Eisenstein has published op-ed pieces in The Guardian and The Huffington Post on topics including genetic modification, the patenting of seeds and debt. He is a contributing editor at the website Reality Sandwich. He appeared on Oprah Winfrey's Super Soul Sunday on July 16, 2017.

Eisenstein periodically publishes essays on his website.

Reception 

In 2013, journalist and author Rory Spowers described Eisenstein as a "refreshing new voice", saying that he is young, fresh, well-informed, humble but articulate, with a very spiritual perspective. He added that Eisenstein is too intelligent to be confrontational but that, through his works, especially The Ascent of Humanity and Sacred Economics, "he's really moved the whole thing along in a number of ways".  Eisenstein was influential in the Occupy Movement

Bibliography 
 The Open Secret, 2001, Authorhouse 
 The Yoga of Eating: Transcending Diets and Dogma to Nourish the Natural Self , 2003, NewTrends Publishing 
 The Ascent of Humanity. Civilization and the Human Sense of Self, 2007, Panenthea Productions 
 Transformational Weight Loss, 2007, Panenthea Press 
 Sacred Economics: Money, Gift, and Society in the Age of Transition, 2011, EVOLVER EDITIONS 
 The More Beautiful World Our Hearts Know Is Possible. The Vision and Practice of Interbeing, 2013, North Atlantic Books 
 Climate: A New Story, 2018,  North Atlantic Books

Notes

References

External links 

 Official website
 Video interview by The Guardian

American anti-globalization writers
American male non-fiction writers
Degrowth advocates
Living people
1967 births